Estadio José Duarte de Paiva,  is a multi-use stadium located in Sete Lagoas, Brazil. It is used mostly for football matches and hosts the home matches of Democrata Futebol Clube. The stadium has a maximum capacity of 4,000 people.

External links
Templos do Futebol

Jose Duarte de Paiva
Sports venues in Minas Gerais